Gustav Adolf Steengracht von Moyland (15 November 1902 – 7 July 1969) was a German diplomat and politician of Dutch descent, who served as Nazi Germany's Secretary of State at the Foreign Office from 1943 to 1945.

Early life
He was born near Kleve, the son of Nicolaas Adriaan Steengracht van Moyland, a Dutch nobleman who received the title of Baron in 1888. Shortly after his birth, Moyland was made a naturalized citizen of Prussia and the German Empire in 1902.

Third Reich
He studied to become a  lawyer. In 1935 Moyland became an assistant to Joachim von Ribbentrop, Nazi Germany's foreign minister.

War crimes
After the war he was arrested as a war criminal. In 1949 he was tried by the Americans at Nuremberg and sentenced to 7 years in prison. However, in 1949, his sentence was reduced to 5 years, and he was released from prison in 1950.

He spent the remainder of his life at his family castle, Schloss Moyland.

German people of Dutch descent
German politicians
German diplomats
1902 births
1969 deaths
People convicted by the United States Nuremberg Military Tribunals